The Brighton Stock Yards were stockyards located in Brighton, Boston. It operated across Market Street from the Brighton Abattoir, as cattle would be loaded into rail cars of the Boston and Albany Railroad and transported west.

References

Brighton, Boston
Former buildings and structures in Boston
History of Boston
Meat processing in the United States